DVDRW can refer to:
DVD-RW
DVD+RW